Viola Muir (born 4 November 1934) is a Canadian archer who competed in the 1972 Summer Olympic Games in archery. Muir was born in Duncan, British Columbia.

She finished 39th in the women's individual event with a score of 1955 points.

References

External links 
 Profile on worldarchery.org

1934 births
Living people
Canadian female archers
Olympic archers of Canada
Archers at the 1972 Summer Olympics
20th-century Canadian women
21st-century Canadian women